The molelike mouse, Juscelinomys vulpinus, is a rodent species from South America. It is found in Brazil.

Juscelinomys
Taxa named by Herluf Winge